Breach (stylized as (Breach)) is the third studio album by the Wallflowers. The album's first single was "Sleepwalker", the video of which poked fun at lead-singer Jakob Dylan's "rock star" status following the success of Bringing Down the Horse. Guests on the album included Elvis Costello, who performed vocals on "Murder 101". Despite good reviews, the album failed to follow the commercial success of Bringing Down the Horse and was seen as somewhat of a commercial failure. "Breach" peaked at number 13 on the Billboard 200 and was certified Gold.

History and Reception

Despite weak album sales, "Breach" managed to receive strong reviews from critics. AllMusic said of the album: "On the surface, there's not much different between this album and its predecessor, but the songs are stronger, sharper, and the performances are lean, muscular, and immediate." Rolling Stone was also receptive of the album, stating: "The slow stuff might be a bit ponderous, but the first six or seven songs manage a rare trick: They're incandescent enough to jump out at you on the radio, yet are steeped in a type of introspective inquiry that was once integral to rock & roll, and has nearly vanished."

A Spin magazine article looking back on Jakob Dylan's 30 year career, noted that "Breach" alludes to his mixed feelings about his lineage and fame more than any other album in his discography. Spin commented that "Dylan addresses the cynics on lead single “Sleepwalker,” a catchy rocker that reflects how Dylan felt at the height of his fame: like a dazed character drifting through his own life." They similarly point to "Hand me Down" where "Dylan sings self-effacingly about the perception of having failed to live up to his pedigree." As part of an interview for the piece, Dylan told Spin that "I like that record a lot. It’s more complicated than Bringing Down The Horse, and I think I started getting better as a songwriter.”

In another retrospective interview with Uproxx, Dylan said that while this was a "difficult record to make," he feels it features some of his best songwriting. He told music critic Steven Hyden that "By Breach, I knew there was going to be scrutiny on some of the songs and I decided that I was just going to not care about it."

Track listing
All songs written by Jakob Dylan.

 "Letters from the Wasteland" – 4:29
 "Hand Me Down" – 3:35
 "Sleepwalker" – 3:31
 "I've Been Delivered" – 5:01
 "Witness" – 3:34
 "Some Flowers Bloom Dead" – 4:44
 "Mourning Train" – 4:04
 "Up from Under" – 3:39
 "Murder 101" – 2:32
 "Birdcage" – 3:28 (total 7:42 with "Babybird")
 "Babybird" (hidden track) – 3:40

Bonus CD
Some editions include a two-track bonus CD. 
 "Invisible City" (live) – 6:29
 On alternative releases, bonus track one is an acoustic version of Sleepwalker – 3:17
 "Sleepwalker" (Andy Wallace remix) – 3:25

Personnel
The Wallflowers
Mario Calire – drums, percussion
Jakob Dylan – lead and backing vocals, rhythm guitar
Rami Jaffee – keyboards, backing vocals
Greg Richling – bass guitar
Michael Ward – lead guitar, backing vocals

Additional Personnel
Matt Chamberlain – drums
Greg Leisz – additional musician
Jon Brion – additional musician
Lenny Castro – percussion
Mike Campbell – guitar
Elvis Costello – backing vocals
Michael Penn – backing vocals
Chris Penn – backing vocals
Frank Black – backing vocals
Gary Louris – backing vocals
Buddy Judge – backing vocals
Joul Derouin – strings
Suzie Katayama – strings
Karie Prescott – strings
Michele Richards – strings
Greg Adams – horns
Kenneth Kugler – horns
Nicholas Lane – horns
Salvator Cracchiolo – horns
Mitchell Froom – horns arranger
Michael Penn – production
Andrew Slater – production
Ted Jensen – mastering
Tom Lord-Alge – mixing

Charts

References

The Wallflowers albums
2000 albums
Interscope Records albums
Albums produced by Michael Penn